Louis-Charles Bary (16 September 1926 – 31 January 2023) was a French trade unionist and politician.

Biography

Early life and education
Born in Meudon on 16 September 1926, Bary was raised in a family of an industrialist father and a stay-at-home mother. In 1939, his family moved to Yonne, near his father's factories. After graduating from the Lycée Pasteur, he studied at Sciences Po and earned his diploma in 1948.

Career
After his studies, Bary became a textile worker and joined the Syndicat français des textiles artificiels et synthétiques, of which he served as General Secretary from 1962 to 1966, general delegate from 1966 to 1972, vice-president from 1972 to 1974, and president from 1974 to 1987. He was also president of the Union des industries textiles from 1986 to 1991.

Throughout his career, Bary was heavily active within French trade unionism, particularly through the Conseil national du patronat français (CNPF), where he chaired several bodies, such as the Union d'économie sociale pour le logement. He was Vice-President of the CNPF from 1986 to 1992, the President of the Commission du logement social from 1995 to 1999.

Politics
As a member of the Independent Republicans, Bary was elected to the Municipal Council of Neuilly-sur-Seine in 1965 on the list of Achille Peretti, who became Deputy Mayor in 1969. After Peretti's death in 1983, he ran for Mayor but was narrowly defeated by Nicolas Sarkozy. He was consistently elected in the first round in cantonal elections in 1982, 1988, 1994, and 2001. He did not stand in the 2008 cantonal election.

Bary was a member of the Union for French Democracy from 1978 to 1997, of Liberal Democracy from 1997 to 2002, and of the Union for a Popular Movement from 2002 until his retirement. After Nicolas Sarkozy was appointed Minister of the Interior, Bary was elected Mayor of Neuilly-sur-Seine on 19 June 2002 and did not stand for re-election in 2008.

Death
Bary died in Neuilly-sur-Seine on 31 January 2023, at the age of 96.

Decorations
Commander of the Legion of Honour
Officer of the Ordre des Arts et des Lettres

References

1926 births
2023 deaths
French trade unionists
Mayors of places in Île-de-France
Independent Republicans politicians
Republican Party (France) politicians
Union for French Democracy politicians
Union for a Popular Movement politicians
Liberal Democracy (France) politicians
Lycée Pasteur (Neuilly-sur-Seine) alumni
Sciences Po alumni
People from Meudon
Commandeurs of the Légion d'honneur
Officers of the Ordre national du Mérite
Officiers of the Ordre des Arts et des Lettres